Papi Khaldar-e Olya (also Romanized as Pāpī Khāldār-e ‘Olyā; also known as Pāpī Khāldār and Pāpī Khāldār-e Bālā) is a village in Robat Rural District, in the Central District of Khorramabad County, Lorestan Province, Iran. At the 2006 census, its population was 859, in 182 families.

References 

Towns and villages in Khorramabad County